Razuiyeh (also Romanized as Razū’īyeh; also known as Razoo) is a village in Mosaferabad Rural District, Rudkhaneh District, Rudan County, Hormozgan Province, Iran. At the 2006 census, its population was 305, in 60 families.

References 

Populated places in Rudan County